Cosmopterix crassicervicella is a moth of the  family Cosmopterigidae. It is found from southern France and the Iberian Peninsula to Greece and Crete. It is also found on the Canary Islands and in the United Arab Emirates.

Adults are on wing from mid-April to mid-June and again from the end of August to the end of October.

The larvae feed on Cyperus species. They mine the leaves of their host plant. The mine consists of a blotch that extends to the tip of the leaf. During feeding pauses, the larva retreats into the central part of the mine that is lined with silk, which causes the leaf to contract. Pupation takes place in this shelter.

References

crassicervicella
Moths of Asia
Moths of Europe